The following article is a complete discography of every album and single released by American pop, soul and blues music artist Taylor Hicks, who won the fifth season of American Idol in 2006.

Albums

Studio albums

Live albums

Compilation albums

Singles

Music videos

References

American Idol discographies
Discographies of American artists
Blues discographies
Pop music discographies
Rhythm and blues discographies